Death of a Tea Master (Sen no Rikyu: Honkakubô ibun also known as Sen no Rikyū: Honkakubo's Student Writings) is a 1989 Japanese biographical drama film directed by Kei Kumai. It is based on real life events of Sen no Rikyū, particularly the events surrounding his  ritual suicide. It was entered into the main competition at the 46th Venice International Film Festival, in which it won the Silver Lion.

Cast 
 Eiji Okuda as  Honkakubo
 Toshiro Mifune as  Sen no Rikyū
 Kinnosuke Yorozuya as  Oda Urakusai
 Go Kato as  Furuta Oribe
 Shinsuke Ashida as  Toyotomi Hideyoshi

References

External links
 

1989 films
Japanese biographical drama films
1980s biographical drama films
Films directed by Kei Kumai
Films set in Kyoto
Cultural depictions of Toyotomi Hideyoshi
Cultural depictions of Tokugawa Ieyasu
Cultural depictions of Oda Nobunaga
1989 crime drama films
1980s Japanese films
1980s Japanese-language films